

Events

Pre-1600
1091 – Battle of Levounion: The Pechenegs are defeated by Byzantine Emperor Alexios I Komnenos.
1386 – Battle of the Vikhra River: The Principality of Smolensk is defeated by the Grand Duchy of Lithuania and becomes its vassal.
1429 – Joan of Arc arrives to relieve the Siege of Orléans.
1483 – Gran Canaria, the main island of the Canary Islands, is conquered by the Kingdom of Castile.
1521 – Swedish War of Liberation: Swedish troops defeat a Danish force in the Battle of Västerås.

1601–1900
1624 – French king Louis XIII names Cardinal Richelieu chief minister of France.
1760 – French forces commence the siege of Quebec which is held by the British.
1770 – James Cook arrives in Australia at Botany Bay, which he names.
1781 – American Revolutionary War: British and French ships clash in the Battle of Fort Royal off the coast of Martinique.
1826 – The galaxy Centaurus A or NGC 5128 is discovered by James Dunlop.
1852 – Roget's Thesaurus, created by Peter Roget, was released to the public.
1861 – Maryland in the American Civil War: Maryland's House of Delegates votes not to secede from the Union.
1862 – American Civil War: The Capture of New Orleans by Union forces under David Farragut.
1864 – Theta Xi fraternity is founded at Rensselaer Polytechnic Institute, the only fraternity to be founded during the American Civil War.

1901–present
1903 – A landslide kills 70 people in Frank, in the District of Alberta, Canada.
1910 – The Parliament of the United Kingdom passes the People's Budget, the first budget in British history with the expressed intent of redistributing wealth among the British public.
1911 – Tsinghua University, one of mainland China's leading universities, is founded.
1916 – World War I: The UK's 6th Indian Division surrenders to Ottoman Forces at the Siege of Kut in one of the largest surrenders of British forces up to that point.
  1916   – Easter Rising: After six days of fighting, Irish rebel leaders surrender to British forces in Dublin, bringing the Easter Rising to an end.
1944 – World War II: New Zealand-born SOE agent Nancy Wake, a leading figure in the French Resistance and the Gestapo's most wanted person, parachutes back into France to be a liaison between London and the local maquis group.
1945 – World War II: The Surrender of Caserta is signed by the commander of German forces in Italy.
  1945   – World War II: Airdrops of food begin over German-occupied regions of the Netherlands.
  1945   – World War II: HMS Goodall (K479) is torpedoed by U-286 outside the Kola Inlet, becoming the last Royal Navy ship to be sunk in the European theatre of World War II.
  1945   – World War II: Führerbunker: Adolf Hitler marries his longtime partner Eva Braun in a Berlin bunker and designates Admiral Karl Dönitz as his successor; Hitler and Braun both commit suicide the following day.
  1945   – Dachau concentration camp is liberated by United States troops.
  1945   – The Italian commune of Fornovo di Taro is liberated from German forces by Brazilian forces.
1946 – The International Military Tribunal for the Far East convenes and indicts former Prime Minister of Japan Hideki Tojo and 28 former Japanese leaders for war crimes.
1951 – Tibetan delegates arrive in Beijing and sign a Seventeen Point Agreement for Chinese sovereignty and Tibetan autonomy.
1953 – The first U.S. experimental 3D television broadcast shows an episode of Space Patrol on Los Angeles ABC affiliate KECA-TV.
1965 – Pakistan's Space and Upper Atmosphere Research Commission (SUPARCO) successfully launches its seventh rocket in its Rehber series.
1967 – After refusing induction into the United States Army the previous day, Muhammad Ali is stripped of his boxing title.
1968 – The controversial musical Hair, a product of the hippie counter-culture and sexual revolution of the 1960s, opens at the Biltmore Theatre on Broadway, with some of its songs becoming anthems of the anti-Vietnam War movement.
1970 – Vietnam War: United States and South Vietnamese forces invade Cambodia to hunt Viet Cong.
1974 – Watergate scandal: United States President Richard Nixon announces the release of edited transcripts of White House tape recordings relating to the scandal.
1975 – Vietnam War: Operation Frequent Wind: The U.S. begins to evacuate U.S. citizens from Saigon before an expected North Vietnamese takeover. U.S. involvement in the war comes to an end.
  1975   – Vietnam War: The North Vietnamese army completes its capture of all parts of South Vietnamese-held Trường Sa Islands.
1986 – A fire at the Central library of the City of Los Angeles Public Library damages or destroys 400,000 books and other items.
  1986   – Chernobyl disaster: American and European spy satellites capture the ruins of the 4th Reactor at the Chernobyl Power Plant.
  1991   – The 7.0  Racha earthquake affects Georgia with a maximum MSK intensity of IX (Destructive), killing 270 people.
1992 – Riots in Los Angeles, following the acquittal of police officers charged with excessive force in the beating of Rodney King. Over the next three days 63 people are killed and hundreds of buildings are destroyed.
1997 – The Chemical Weapons Convention of 1993 enters into force, outlawing the production, stockpiling and use of chemical weapons by its signatories.
2004 – The final Oldsmobile is built in Lansing, Michigan, ending 107 years of vehicle production.
2011 – The Wedding of Prince William and Catherine Middleton takes place at Westminster Abbey in London.
2013 – A powerful explosion occurs in an office building in Prague, believed to have been caused by natural gas, and injures 43 people.
  2013   – National Airlines Flight 102, a Boeing 747-400 freighter aircraft, crashes during takeoff from Bagram Airfield in Parwan Province, Afghanistan, killing seven people.
2015 – A baseball game between the Baltimore Orioles and the Chicago White Sox sets the all-time low attendance mark for Major League Baseball. Zero fans were in attendance for the game, as the stadium was officially closed to the public due to the 2015 Baltimore protests.

Births

Pre-1600
 912 – Minamoto no Mitsunaka, Japanese samurai (d. 997)
1469 – William II, Landgrave of Hesse (d. 1509)
1587 – Sophie of Saxony, Duchess of Pomerania (d. 1635)

1601–1900
1636 – Esaias Reusner, German lute player and composer (d. 1679)
1665 – James Butler, 2nd Duke of Ormonde, Irish general and politician, Lord Lieutenant of Ireland (d. 1745)
1667 – John Arbuthnot, Scottish-English physician and polymath (d. 1735)
1686 – Peregrine Bertie, 2nd Duke of Ancaster and Kesteven, English politician, Lord Great Chamberlain (d. 1742)
1727 – Jean-Georges Noverre, French actor and dancer (d. 1810)
1745 – Oliver Ellsworth, American lawyer and politician, 3rd Chief Justice of the United States (d. 1807)
1758 – Georg Carl von Döbeln, Swedish general (d. 1820)
1762 – Jean-Baptiste Jourdan, French general and politician, French Minister of Foreign Affairs (d. 1833)
1780 – Charles Nodier, French librarian and author (d. 1844)
1783 – David Cox, English landscape painter (d. 1859)
1784 – Samuel Turell Armstrong, American publisher and politician, 14th Lieutenant Governor of Massachusetts (d. 1850)
1810 – Thomas Adolphus Trollope, English journalist and author (d. 1892)
1814 – Sadok Barącz, Galician religious leader, historian, folklorist, archivist (d. 1892) 
1818 – Alexander II of Russia (d. 1881)
1837 – Georges Ernest Boulanger, French general and politician, French Minister of War (d. 1891)
1842 – Carl Millöcker, Austrian composer and conductor (d. 1899)
1847 – Joachim Andersen, Danish flautist, composer and conductor (d. 1907)
1848 – Raja Ravi Varma, Indian painter and academic (d. 1906)
1854 – Henri Poincaré, French mathematician, physicist and engineer (d. 1912)
1858 – Georgia Hopley, American journalist, temperance advocate, and the first woman prohibition agent (d. 1944) 
1863 – Constantine P. Cavafy, Egyptian-Greek journalist and poet (d. 1933)
  1863   – William Randolph Hearst, American publisher and politician, founded the Hearst Corporation (d. 1951)
  1863   – Maria Teresia Ledóchowska, Austrian nun and missionary (d. 1922)
1872 – Harry Payne Whitney, American businessman and lawyer (d. 1930)
  1872   – Forest Ray Moulton, American astronomer and academic (d. 1952)
1875 – Rafael Sabatini, Italian-English novelist and short story writer (d. 1950)
1878 – Friedrich Adler, German academic, artist and designer (d. 1945)
1879 – Thomas Beecham, English conductor (d. 1961)
1880 – Fethi Okyar, Turkish military officer, diplomat and politician (d. 1943)
1882 – Auguste Herbin, French painter (d. 1960)
  1882   – Hendrik Nicolaas Werkman, Dutch printer, typographer, and Nazi resister (d. 1945)
1885 – Egon Erwin Kisch, Czech journalist and author (d. 1948)
1887 – Raymond Thorne, American swimmer (d. 1921)
1891 – Bharathidasan, Indian poet and activist (d. 1964)
1893 – Harold Urey, American chemist and astronomer, Nobel Prize laureate (d. 1981)
1894 – Marietta Blau, Austrian physicist and academic (d. 1970)
1895 – Vladimir Propp, Russian scholar and critic (d. 1970)
  1895   – Malcolm Sargent, English organist, composer and conductor (d. 1967)
1899 – Duke Ellington, American pianist, composer and bandleader (d. 1974)
  1899   – Mary Petty, American illustrator (d. 1976)
1900 – Concha de Albornoz, Spanish feminist and intellectual (d. 1972)
  1900   – Amelia Best, Australian politician (d. 1979)

1901–present
1901 – Hirohito, Japanese emperor (d. 1989)
1907 – Fred Zinnemann, Austrian-American director and producer (d. 1997)
1908 – Jack Williamson, American author and academic (d. 2006)
1909 – Tom Ewell, American actor (d. 1994)
1912 – Richard Carlson, American actor, director, and screenwriter (d. 1977)
1915 – Henry H. Barschall, German-American physicist and academic (d. 1997)
1917 – Maya Deren, Ukrainian-American director, poet, and photographer (d. 1961)
  1917   – Celeste Holm, American actress and singer (d. 2012)
1918 – George Allen, American football player and coach (d. 1990)
1919 – Gérard Oury, French actor, director and screenwriter (d. 2006)
1920 – Edward Blishen, English author and radio host (d. 1996)
  1920   – Harold Shapero, American composer (d. 2013)
1922 – Helmut Krackowizer, Austrian motorcycle racer and journalist (d. 2001)
  1922   – Toots Thielemans, Belgian guitarist and harmonica player (d. 2016)
1923 – Irvin Kershner, American actor, director and producer (d. 2010)
1924 – Al Balding, Canadian golfer (d. 2006)
  1924   – Zizi Jeanmaire, French ballerina and actress (d. 2020)
1925 – John Compton, Saint Lucian lawyer and politician, 1st Prime Minister of Saint Lucia (d. 2007)
  1925   – Iwao Takamoto, American animator, director, and producer (d. 2007)
1926 – Elmer Kelton, American journalist and author (d. 2009)
1927 – Dorothy Manley, English sprinter (d. 2021)
  1927   – Bill Slater, English footballer (d. 2018)
1928 – Carl Gardner, American singer (d. 2011)
  1928   – Heinz Wolff, German-English physiologist, engineer, and academic (d. 2017)
1929 – Walter Kempowski, German author and academic (d. 2007)
  1929   – Mickey McDermott, American baseball player and coach (d. 2003)
  1929   – Peter Sculthorpe, Australian composer and conductor (d. 2014)
  1929   – Maurice Strong, Canadian businessman and diplomat (d. 2015)
  1929   – Jeremy Thorpe, English lawyer and politician (d. 2014)
  1929   – April Stevens, American pop singer
1930 – Jean Rochefort, French actor and director (d. 2017)
1931 – Frank Auerbach, British-German painter
  1931   – Lonnie Donegan, Scottish-English singer-songwriter and guitarist (d. 2002)
  1931   – Chris Pearson, Canadian politician, 1st Premier of Yukon (d. 2014)
1932 – Joy Clements, American soprano and actress (d. 2005)
  1932   – David Tindle, English painter and educator
  1932   – Dmitry Zaikin, Soviet pilot and cosmonaut instructor (d. 2013)
1933 – Ed Charles, American baseball player and coach (d. 2018)
  1933   – Mark Eyskens, Belgian economist and politician, 61st Prime Minister of Belgium
  1933   – Rod McKuen, American singer-songwriter and poet (d. 2015)
  1933   – Willie Nelson, American singer-songwriter, guitarist, producer and actor 
1934 – Luis Aparicio, Venezuelan-American baseball player
  1934   – Peter de la Billière, English general
  1934   – Erika Fisch, German sprinter and hurdler
  1934   – Pedro Pires, Cape Verdean politician, 3rd President of Cape Verde
1935 – Otis Rush, American blues singer-songwriter and guitarist (d. 2018)
1936 – Zubin Mehta, Indian bassist and conductor
  1936   – Adolfo Nicolás, Spanish priest, 13th Superior General of the Society of Jesus (d. 2020)
  1936   – Jacob Rothschild, 4th Baron Rothschild, English banker and philanthropist
1937 – Arvo Mets, Estonian-Russian poet and translator (d. 1997)
  1937   – Jill Paton Walsh, English author (d. 2020)
1938 – Bernie Madoff, American businessman, financier and convicted felon (d. 2021)
  1938   – Klaus Voormann, German artist, bass player, and producer
1940 – Stephanos of Tallinn, Estonian metropolitan
  1940   – Brian Taber, Australian cricketer
1941 – Jonah Barrington, English-Irish squash player
  1941   – Dorothy Edgington, British philosopher
  1941   – Hanne Darboven, German painter (d. 2009)
1942 – Lynda Chalker, Baroness Chalker of Wallasey, English politician, Minister of State for Europe
  1942   – Rennie Fritchie, Baroness Fritchie, English civil servant and academic
  1942   – Galina Kulakova, Russian skier
1943 – Duane Allen, American country singer
  1943   – Brenda Dean, Baroness Dean of Thornton-le-Fylde, English union leader and politician (d. 2018)
  1943   – Ruth Deech, Baroness Deech, English lawyer and academic
1944 – Francis Lee, English footballer and businessman
1945 – Brian Charlesworth, English biologist, geneticist, and academic
  1945   – Hugh Hopper, English bass guitarist (d. 2009)
  1945   – Catherine Lara, French singer-songwriter and violinist
  1945   – Tammi Terrell, American soul singer-songwriter (d. 1970)
1946 – Aleksander Wolszczan, Polish astronomer
1947 – Serge Bernier, Canadian ice hockey player
  1947   – Tommy James, American singer-songwriter, guitarist, and producer 
  1947   – Johnny Miller, American golfer and sportscaster
  1947   – Jim Ryun, American runner and politician
1948 – Bruce Cutler, American lawyer
1950 – Paul Holmes, New Zealand journalist (d. 2013)
  1950   – Phillip Noyce, Australian director and producer
  1950   – Debbie Stabenow, American social worker and politician
1951 – Rick Burleson, American baseball player
  1951   – Dale Earnhardt, American race car driver (d. 2001)
  1951   – John Holmes, English diplomat, British Ambassador to France
1952 – Nora Dunn, American actress and comedian
  1952   – David Icke, English footballer and sportscaster
  1952   – Bob McClure, American baseball player and coach
  1952   – Rob Nicholson, Canadian lawyer and politician, 11th Canadian Minister of Foreign Affairs
  1952   – Ron Washington, American baseball player and manager
1954 – Jake Burton Carpenter, American snowboarder and businessman
  1954   – Jerry Seinfeld, American comedian, actor and producer
1955 – Don McKinnon, Australian rugby league player
  1955   – Kate Mulgrew, American actress
1956 – Karen Barad, American physicist and philosopher
1957 – Daniel Day-Lewis, British-Irish actor
1958 – Michelle Pfeiffer, American actress
  1958   – Eve Plumb, American actress
  1958   – Gary Cohen, American baseball play-by-play announcer
  1958   – Kevin Moore, English footballer (d. 2013) 
1960 – Bill Glasson, American golfer
  1960   – Robert J. Sawyer, Canadian author and academic
1962 – Bruce Driver, Canadian ice hockey player and coach
  1962   – Rob Druppers, Dutch runner
  1962   – Stephan Burger, German Catholic archbishop
1963 – Mike Babcock, Canadian ice hockey player and coach
1964 – Federico Castelluccio, Italian-American actor, director, producer, and screenwriter
  1964   – Radek Jaroš, Czech mountaineer and author
1965 – Michel Bussi, French geographer, author, and academic
  1965   – Peter Rauhofer, Austrian-American disc jockey and producer (d. 2013)
  1965   – Larisa Turchinskaya, Russian-Australian heptathlete and coach
  1965   – Brendon Tuuta, New Zealand rugby league player
1966 – Christian Tetzlaff, German violinist
  1966   – Phil Tufnell, English cricketer and radio host
1967 – Marcel Albers, Dutch race car driver (d. 1992)
  1967   – Curtis Joseph, Canadian ice hockey player and coach
1968 – Kolinda Grabar-Kitarović, 4th President of Croatia
  1968   – Carnie Wilson, American singer-songwriter 
1969 – Jack Mackenroth, American swimmer, model, and fashion designer
1970 – Andre Agassi, American tennis player
  1970   – Uma Thurman, American actress 
1972 – Dustin McDaniel, American lawyer and politician, 55th Arkansas Attorney General
1974 – Jasper Wood, Canadian violinist and educator
  1974   – Anggun, Indonesian-French singer-songwriter
1975 – Rafael Betancourt, Venezuelan baseball player
  1975   – Artem Yashkin, Ukrainian footballer
1976 – Fabio Liverani, Italian footballer and manager 
  1976   – Chiyotaikai Ryūji, Japanese sumo wrestler
1977 – Zuzana Hejdová, Czech tennis player
  1977   – Claus Jensen, Danish international footballer and manager
  1977   – Titus O'Neil, American football player and wrestler
  1977   – Attila Zsivoczky, Hungarian decathlete and high jumper
1978 – Tony Armas Jr., Venezuelan baseball player
  1978   – Bob Bryan, American tennis player
  1978   – Mike Bryan, American tennis player
  1978   – Javier Colon, American singer-songwriter and musician
  1978   – Craig Gower, Australian rugby player
  1978   – Tyler Labine, Canadian actor and comedian
1979 – Lee Dong-gook, South Korean footballer
  1979   – Ryan Sharp, Scottish race car driver and manager
1980 – Mathieu Biron, Canadian ice hockey player
  1980   – Kelly Shoppach, American baseball player
1981 – Lisa Allen, English chef
  1981   – George McCartney, Northern Irish footballer
  1981   – Émilie Mondor, Canadian runner (d. 2006)
1983 – Jay Cutler, American football player
  1983   – Tommie Harris, American football player
  1983   – David Lee, American basketball player
1984 – Kirby Cote, Canadian swimmer
  1984   – Paulius Jankūnas, Lithuanian basketball player
  1984   – Lina Krasnoroutskaya, Russian tennis player
  1984   – Vassilis Xanthopoulos, Greek basketball player
1985 – Jean-François Jacques, Canadian ice hockey player
1986 – Byun Yo-han, South Korean actor
  1986   – Lee Chae-young, South Korean actress
  1986   – Viljar Veski, Estonian basketball player
  1986   – Sisa Waqa, Fijian rugby league player
  1986   – Monique Alfradique, Brazilian actress
1987 – Rob Atkinson, English footballer
  1987   – Knut Børsheim, Norwegian golfer
  1987   – Sara Errani, Italian tennis player
  1987   – Andre Russell, Jamaican cricketer
1988 – Elías Hernández, Mexican footballer
  1988   – Alfred Hui, Hong Kong singer
  1988   – Taoufik Makhloufi, Algerian athlete
  1988   – Jonathan Toews, Canadian ice hockey player
  1988   – Younha, South Korean singer-songwriter and record producer
 1989 – Candace Owens, American conservative influencer, political commentator and activist.
1990 – James Faulkner, Australian cricketer
  1990   – Chris Johnson, American basketball player
1991 – Adam Smith, English footballer
  1991   – Jung Hye-sung, South Korean actress
  1991   – Misaki Doi, Japanese tennis player
1992 – Emilio Orozco, American soccer player
  1992   – Alina Rosenberg, German paralympic equestrian
1994 – Christina Shakovets, German tennis player
1995 – Victoria Sinitsina, Russian ice dancer
1996 – Katherine Langford, Australian actress
1998 – Kimberly Birrell, Australian tennis player
  1998   – Mallory Pugh, American soccer player
2002 – Sinja Kraus, Austrian tennis player
2007 – Infanta Sofía of Spain, Spanish princess

Deaths

Pre-1600
 643 – Hou Junji, Chinese general and politician, Chancellor of the Tang dynasty
 926 – Burchard II, Duke of Swabia (b. 883)
1380 – Catherine of Siena, Italian mystic, philosopher and saint (b. 1347)
1417 – Louis II of Anjou (b. 1377)
1594 – Thomas Cooper, English bishop, lexicographer, and theologian (b. 1517)

1601–1900
1630 – Agrippa d'Aubigné, French soldier and poet (b. 1552)
1658 – John Cleveland, English poet and author (b. 1613)
1676 – Michiel de Ruyter, Dutch admiral (b. 1607)
1688 – Frederick William, Elector of Brandenburg (b. 1620)
1698 – Charles Cornwallis, 3rd Baron Cornwallis, English politician, Lord Lieutenant of Suffolk (b. 1655)
1707 – George Farquhar, Irish-English actor and playwright (b. 1678)
1743 – Charles-Irénée Castel de Saint-Pierre, French theorist and author (b. 1658)
1768 – Georg Brandt, Swedish chemist and mineralogist (b. 1694)
1771 – Francesco Bartolomeo Rastrelli, French-Italian architect, designed Winter Palace and Catherine Palace (b. 1700)
1776 – Edward Wortley Montagu, English explorer and author (b. 1713)
1798 – Nikolaus Poda von Neuhaus, Austrian entomologist and author (b. 1723)
1833 – William Babington, Anglo-Irish physician and mineralogist (b. 1756)
1848 – Chester Ashley, American politician (b. 1790)
1854 – Henry Paget, 1st Marquess of Anglesey, English field marshal and politician, Lord Lieutenant of Ireland (b. 1768)

1901–present
1903 – Godfrey Carter, Australian businessman and politician, 39th Mayor of Melbourne (b. 1830)
1903 – Paul Du Chaillu, French-American anthropologist and zoologist (b. 1835)
1905 – Ignacio Cervantes, Cuban pianist and composer (b. 1847)
1916 – Jørgen Pedersen Gram, Danish mathematician and academic (b. 1850)
1920 – William H. Seward Jr., American general and banker (b. 1839)
1921 – Arthur Mold, English cricketer (b. 1863)
1933 – Clay Stone Briggs, American politician (b. 1876)
  1933   – Constantine P. Cavafy, Greek poet and journalist (b. 1863)
1937 – William Gillette, American actor and playwright (b. 1853)
1944 – Bernardino Machado, Portuguese academic and politician, 3rd President of Portugal (b. 1851)
1945 – Matthias Kleinheisterkamp, German SS officer (b. 1893)
1947 – Irving Fisher, American economist and statistician (b. 1867)
1951 – Ludwig Wittgenstein, Austrian-English philosopher and academic (b. 1889)
1954 – K. C. Groom, Australian-English author and screenwriter (b. 1872)
1956 – Harold Bride, English soldier and operator (b. 1890)
  1956   – Wilhelm Ritter von Leeb, German field marshal (b. 1876)
1959 – Kenneth Anderson, English soldier and Governor of Gibraltar (b. 1891)
1964 – Rae Johnstone, Australian jockey (b. 1905)
1966 – William Eccles, English physicist and engineer (b. 1875)
  1966   – Paula Strasberg, American actress and acting coach (b. 1909)
1967 – J. B. Lenoir, American singer-songwriter and guitarist (b. 1929)
1968 – Lin Zhao, Chinese dissident (b. 1932)
1976 – Edvard Drabløs, Norwegian actor and director (b. 1883)
1978 – Theo Helfrich, German race car driver (b. 1913) 
1979 – Muhsin Ertuğrul, Turkish actor and director (b. 1892)
  1979   – Hardie Gramatky, American author and illustrator (b. 1907)
1980 – Alfred Hitchcock, English-American director and producer (b. 1899)
1982 – Raymond Bussières, French actor, producer and screenwriter (b. 1907)
1992 – Mae Clarke, American actress (b. 1910)
1993 – Michael Gordon, American actor and director (b. 1909)
  1993   – Mick Ronson, English guitarist, songwriter and producer (b. 1946)
1997 – Mike Royko, American journalist and author (b. 1932)
2000 – Phạm Văn Đồng, Vietnamese lieutenant and politician, 2nd Prime Minister of Vietnam (b. 1906)
2001 – Arthur B. C. Walker Jr., American physicist and academic (b. 1936)
2002 – Bob Akin, American race car driver and journalist (b. 1936)
2003 – Janko Bobetko, Croatian Army general and Chief of the General Staff (b. 1919)
2004 – Sid Smith, Canadian ice hockey player and coach (b. 1925)
2005 – William J. Bell, American screenwriter and producer (b. 1927)
  2005   – Louis Leithold, American mathematician and academic (b. 1924)
2006 – John Kenneth Galbraith, Canadian-American economist and diplomat, United States Ambassador to India (b. 1908)
2007 – Milt Bocek, American baseball player and soldier (b. 1912)
  2007   – Josh Hancock, American baseball player (b. 1978)
  2007   – Dick Motz, New Zealand cricketer and rugby player (b. 1940)
  2007   – Ivica Račan, Croatian politician, 7th Prime Minister of Croatia (b. 1944)
2008 – Gordon Bradley, English-American footballer (b. 1933)
  2008   – Albert Hofmann, Swiss chemist and academic (b. 1906)
2010 – Sandy Douglas, English computer scientist and academic, designed OXO (b. 1921)
2011 – Siamak Pourzand, Iranian journalist and critic (b. 1931)
  2011   – Joanna Russ, American writer, academic and radical feminist (b. 1937)
2012 – Shukri Ghanem, Libyan politician, 22nd Prime Minister of Libya (b. 1942)
  2012   – Joel Goldsmith, American composer and conductor (b. 1957)
  2012   – Roland Moreno. French engineer, invented the smart card (b. 1945)
  2012   – Kenny Roberts, American singer-songwriter (b. 1926)
2013 – Alex Elisala, New Zealand-Australian rugby player (b. 1992)
  2013   – Pesah Grupper, Israeli politician, 13th Israel Minister of Agriculture (b. 1924)
  2013   – Parekura Horomia, New Zealand politician, 40th Minister of Māori Affairs (b. 1950)
  2013   – John La Montaine, American pianist and composer (b. 1920)
  2013   – Ernest Michael, American mathematician and scholar (b. 1925)
  2013   – Kevin Moore, English footballer (b. 1958)
  2013   – Marianna Zachariadi, Greek pole vaulter (b. 1990)
2014 – Iveta Bartošová, Czech singer and actress (b. 1966)
  2014   – Al Feldstein, American author and illustrator (b. 1925)
  2014   – Bob Hoskins, English actor (b. 1942)
  2014   – Michael Kadosh, Israeli footballer and manager (b. 1940)
2015 – François Michelin, French businessman (b. 1926)
  2015   – Jean Nidetch, American businesswoman, co-founded Weight Watchers (b. 1923)
  2015   – Calvin Peete, American golfer (b. 1943)
  2015   – Dan Walker, American lawyer and politician, 36th Governor of Illinois (b. 1922)
2016 – Renato Corona, Filipino lawyer and jurist, 23rd Chief Justice of the Supreme Court of the Philippines (b. 1948)
2019 – Josef Šural, Czech footballer (b. 1990)
2021 – Cate Haste, English author (b. 1945)

Holidays and observances
 Christian feast day:
 Catherine of Siena (Catholic, Lutheran and Anglican Church)
 Endelienta
 Hugh of Cluny
 Robert of Molesme
 Torpes of Pisa
 Wilfrid II
 April 29 (Eastern Orthodox liturgics)
 Day of Remembrance for all Victims of Chemical Warfare (United Nations)
 International Dance Day (UNESCO)
 Shōwa Day, traditionally the start of the Golden Week holiday period, which is April 29 and May 3–5. (Japan)

References

External links

 BBC: On This Day
 
 Historical Events on April 29

Days of the year
April